"Mere Rashke Qamar" (lit. "O Envy of the Moon") is a ghazal-qawwali written by Urdu poet Fana Buland Shehri and composed by Nusrat Fateh Ali Khan. It was first performed in 1988 by Khan, and popularized by him and his nephew Rahat Fateh Ali Khan several times in different concerts.

Lyrics 

The lyrics are addressed to an unnamed lover of the narrator.

Versions

2013 remix

It was recreated and released as a single on 5 April 2013 by A1melodymaster for the album Reformed; which released on 16 March 2017 with different renewed songs of Nusrat Fateh Ali Khan.

2017 film version

The song was recreated by lyricist Manoj Muntashir and composer Tanishk Bagchi for Milan Luthria's 2017 Hindi film Baadshaho; written by Rajat Arora. It features original version of Nusrat Fateh Ali Khan's voice with new version of Rahat Fateh Ali Khan's voice. The video; starring Ajay Devgn & Ileana D'Cruz; has been shot in different locales of Bikaner, Jodhpur and Jaisalmer.

Despite other controversies; created after 2016 Uri attack, due to which Pakistani artists were banned from working in India; producer Bhushan Kumar said that he was working for last one-and-a-half year on a track "that brings out the chemistry between Ajay and Ileana's characters". He said, "I was sure it had to be Nusrat saab's composition. I procured the rights and I'm thankful to Rahat for singing it." He felt happy with the response on the new version.

The soundtrack has a female version for the film too, in voice of Tulsi Kumar, which released on 21 August. Its music video was released on 25 August by her father's company T-Series, featuring Kumar herself.

Rahat was nominated for Mirchi Music Award for Male Vocalist of The Year in 10th Mirchi Music Awards, while Muntashir won the IIFA Award for Best Lyricist in 19th IIFA Awards.

Music charts
The 2013 remix achieved chart success in 2017 in the UK, spending a number of weeks on the Official Charts Company before and after the release of 2017 version. Ten days after 2017 version's release, both were on top 14 on the Asian music chart by BBC. The latter than topped the Indian music charts by iTunes, BBC, Bollywood Hungama, Saavn and Gaana, and remained number 1 for weeks until beaten by Taylor Swift's "Look What You Made Me Do" on international level and Sharry Mann's "Hostel" on national level in India. It was also listed top 5 trending music video in India by YouTube Rewind, and was the second most searched song on Google India.

Popularity
The song is very popular in Pakistan and India, and also has been adapted as cover version by many local artists.

Furthermore, the Nusrat's version has also been remixed by DJ Chino ft. Naseebo Lal, and by The Professional Brothers ft. Rahat's voice.

See also
Nusrat Fateh Ali Khan discography
Rahat Fateh Ali Khan discography

References

External links

1988 songs
Nusrat Fateh Ali Khan songs
Ghazal songs
Rahat Fateh Ali Khan songs
Songs written by Tanishk Bagchi
Songs with lyrics by Manoj Muntashir
T-Series (company) singles
Hindi film songs
Urdu-language songs
Macaronic songs